Themes - Volume 4: February 89 - May 90 is box set released by Simple Minds. It was released on 9 October 1990 by Virgin Records.

Track listing

Notes

References

Themes - Volume 4: February 89 - May 90 at The Official Site

1990 compilation albums
Simple Minds compilation albums
Virgin Records compilation albums